Michael Shaara (June 23, 1928 – May 5, 1988) was an American author of science fiction, sports fiction, and historical fiction. He was born to an Italian immigrant father (the family name was originally spelled Sciarra, which in Italian is pronounced in a similar way) in Jersey City, New Jersey, graduated in 1951 from Rutgers University, where he joined Theta Chi, and served as a sergeant in the 82nd Airborne Division prior to the Korean War.

Before Shaara began selling science fiction stories to fiction magazines during the 1950s, he was an amateur boxer and police officer. The stress combined with cigarette smoking led to a heart attack   at the early age of 36. He managed to recover completely and later taught literature at Florida State University while continuing to write fiction. His novel about the Battle of Gettysburg, The Killer Angels, won the Pulitzer Prize for Fiction in 1975. Shaara died of a heart attack in 1988 at the age of 59.

Shaara's children, Jeffrey and Lila, are also novelists. In 1997, Jeffrey Shaara established the annual Michael Shaara Award for Excellence in Civil War Fiction, awarded at Gettysburg College.

Works

Novels
The Broken Place (1968)
The Killer Angels (1974), Winner of the Pulitzer Prize for Fiction in 1975. Later, used as the basis for the film Gettysburg.
The Noah Conspiracy (1981), also known as The Herald. 
For Love of the Game (1991), made into a film in 1999.

Short story collections
Soldier Boy (1982)

Short stories
"Orphans of the Void" (1952) 
"All the Way Back" (1952)
"Grenville's Planet" (1952)
"Be Fruitful and Multiply" (1952)
"Soldier Boy" (1953)
"The Book" (1953)
"The Sling and the Stone" (1954)
"Wainer" (1954)
"The Holes" (1954)
"Time Payment" (1954)
"Beast in the House" (1954)
"The Vanisher" (1954)
"Come to My Party" (1956)
"Man of Distinction" (1956)
"Conquest Over Time" (1956)
"2066: Election Day" (1956)
"Four-Billion Dollar Door" (1956)
"Death of a Hunter" (1957) 
"The Peeping Tom Patrol" (1958)
"The Lovely House" (1958)
 "Citizen Jell" (1959)
"Opening Up Slowly" (1973)
"Border Incident" (1976)
"Starface" (1982) 
"The Dark Angel" (1982)

References

External links

Analysis of Soldier Boy
Biography at jeffshaara.com
Michael Shaara prize details
 
 

1928 births
1988 deaths
20th-century American novelists
American male novelists
American writers of Italian descent
American science fiction writers
American historical novelists
Writers from Jersey City, New Jersey
Pulitzer Prize for Fiction winners
Rutgers University alumni
Novelists from New Jersey
Florida State University faculty
American male short story writers
20th-century American short story writers
20th-century American male writers
Novelists from Florida